Vittorio Meano (1860, Susa, Piedmont1904) was an Italian architect born in Susa, Italy, near Turin.

Background and early career
He studied architecture in Albertina Academy in Turin.

In 1884 he arrived in Argentina to work in the studio of the Italian architect Francesco Tamburini, who at that time was involved in a number of major public works, including the enlargement and renovation of the Casa Rosada.

Buenos Aires: work on Teatro Colón and Argentine National Congress
They worked together on the new building for the Teatro Colón until the death of Tamburini in 1890, after which Meano took charge of the project.

After winning the competition for the design of the Argentine National Congress building in 1895, he became entirely absorbed with these two great public works.

Montevideo: work on Legislative Palace
Meano won the international competition for the design of the Palacio Legislativo building in Montevideo, Uruguay.

Death
Shortly after this achievement, on 1 June 1904 he returned to his residence and found his wife in bed with an Italian named Juan (Giovanni) Passera, after a couple of minutes a shot gun sounds in the house, Vittorio screamed "They murdered me!". Passera was sentenced to seventeen years' imprisonment and Mrs. Meano was deported to Italy as a punishment.

References 
 Portal de arte y arquitectura en Internet

1860 births
1904 deaths
People from Susa, Piedmont
Architects from Buenos Aires
19th-century Italian architects
Art Nouveau architects
Burials at La Recoleta Cemetery